Pablo Nicolás López de León (born 1 March 1996) is a Uruguayan footballer who plays as a midfielder for River Plate in the Uruguayan Primera División.

References

External links
Profile at Sofa Score

1996 births
Living people
Defensor Sporting players
Club Atlético River Plate (Montevideo) players
Uruguayan footballers
Association football midfielders